The Nova Scotia Association of REALTORS (NSAR) is the provincial Board/Association for REALTORS in Nova Scotia, representing 1,500+ real estate brokers and salespeople in 7 regions:

 Cape Breton Region of NSAR
 Halifax Dartmouth Region of NSAR
 Highland Region of NSAR
 Northern Region of NSAR
 South Shore Region of NSAR
 Yarmouth Region of NSAR
 Annapolis Valley Region of NSAR (joined NSAR in January 2016)

NSAR is the first provincial association to change its formal name to incorporate the REALTOR trademark.

The mission of the Association is to enhance Realtors' success by providing services and education to better help them serve the public in real estate transactions. The Association also acts as the voice of real estate in Nova Scotia.

History
 1958 - founded
 2000 - merger of 5 real estate boards and Nova Scotia Real Estate Association
 2016 - Annapolis Valley Real Estate Board becomes a region within NSAR.

See also
 Canadian Real Estate Association
 Multiple Listing Service

External links
 Nova Scotia Association of Realtors
 Nova Scotia Real Estate Commission
 Real Estate Trading Act

Real estate industry trade groups based in Canada
1958 establishments in Canada
Economy of Nova Scotia